The Gaelyn Gordon Award is awarded annually by the Children's Literature Foundation (now called the Storylines Children's Literature Foundation) to a well-loved work of New Zealand children's fiction.

History 
This award is named after Gaelyn Gordon (1939-1997) who was born in Hāwera and taught English and Drama at Hamilton Girls’ High School. She published her first children's book in 1989 and wrote many more books for both children and adults until her death from cancer in 1997. Her books were popular but won no major awards during her lifetime.

The Gaelyn Gordon Award for a Much-Loved Book was established by the Children's Literature Foundation in 1998 to honour her memory and mark her contribution to New Zealand children's literature. It was set up with the help of her three publishers HarperCollins, Scholastic and David Ling Publishing. In 2005, the Children's Literature Foundation was renamed the Storylines Children's Literature Foundation, and the award is now known as the Storylines Gaelyn Gordon Award.

Eligibility 
 The Gaelyn Gordon Award is for a work of fiction which has stood the test of time. It is awarded to a children's book which may not have received initial recognition but has remained in print (or been reprinted) and has proven to be popular and successful over a period of years. 
 The award is made annually and the winning title is chosen by a panel appointed by Storylines.
 The author must still be alive. 
 The book must still be in print and have been in print for at least five years (or else reissued and in print for at least two years). 
 The book may have been shortlisted for a New Zealand award, but it must not have previously won a major New Zealand award (although it may have won an award overseas).

List of recipients

See also 
 List of New Zealand literary awards

External links 
 Storylines Gaelyn Gordon Award  - with a list of prize winners
 Biography of Gaelyn Gordon at New Zealand Book Council: Te Kaunihera Pukapuka o Aotearoa
 Children's and young adult literature at Te Ara

References

New Zealand children's literary awards